Alfred Gomersal Vickers (1810–1837) was an English painter of seascapes and landscapes.

Life
He was born at Lambeth on 21 April 1810, the son of Alfred Vickers (1786–1868), a landscape-painter, who taught him. He was influenced by the watercolourists François Louis Thomas Francia and Richard Parkes Bonington. He began to show his work in 1827.

Vickers exhibited paintings, both in oils and watercolours, at the Royal Academy, British Institution, Suffolk Street gallery, and the New Watercolour Society. He painted mainly marine subjects, but also architecture and figures.

In 1833 Vickers received a commission from Charles Heath to make sketches in Russia for publication. Steel engravings from these and from many of his marine pieces appeared in the annuals for 1835–7. He was beginning to obtain public recognition when he died on 12 January 1837. His pictures were sold at Christie's on 16 February that year.

Notes

External links
Attribution

 A painting of  engraved by E Smith for Fisher's Drawing Room Scrap Book, 1837 with a poetical illustration by Letitia Elizabeth Landon.
 A painting of  engraved by T Barber for Fisher's Drawing Room Scrap Book, 1840 with a posthumous poetical illustration by Letitia Elizabeth Landon.

1810 births
1837 deaths
English landscape painters
English watercolourists
People from Lambeth